The 1955 WANFL season was the 71st season of senior football in Perth, Western Australia.

Ladder

Grand final

References

West Australian Football League seasons
WANFL